Crayon is an unincorporated community in Champaign County, in the U.S. state of Ohio.

History
A post office was established at Crayon in 1879, and remained in operation until 1905. Besides the post office, Crayon had a country store.

References

Unincorporated communities in Champaign County, Ohio
Unincorporated communities in Ohio